Fuxing (also known as the CR series EMU, or as the Fuxing Hao) is a series of high-speed and higher-speed EMU trains operated by China Railway High-speed (CRH) and developed by CRRC, which owns the independent intellectual property rights. Initially known as the China Standardized EMU, development on the project started in 2012, and the design plan was finished in September 2014. The first EMU rolled off the production line on 30 June 2015. The series received its current designation of Fuxing in June 2017, with nicknames such as "Blue/Red Dolphin" (CR400AF) and "Golden Phoenix" (CR400BF) for certain units.

This train will also operate in Indonesia on the Jakarta-Bandung high-speed railway from 2023, with a derivative version of CR400AF, also known as KCIC400AF or Komodo Merah (literally: red komodo dragon) or Petir Merah (literally: red lightning).

History

Background 
In 2007, China's Ministry of Railways drafted a plan for China's future high-speed network. Bombardier Transportation, Kawasaki Heavy Industries, Alstom and later Siemens joined the high-speed train manufacturing project later known as Hexie. Forming a joint-venture with Chinese company CNR and CSR, the four foreign companies signed an agreement with China to manufacture high-speed trains for China as well as provide assistance to a Chinese company to manufacture train cars locally in the future.

Some of the Hexie (Harmony) train sets are manufactured locally through technology transfer, a key requirement for China. The signalling, track and support structures, control software, and station design are developed domestically with additional foreign elements. By 2010, the track system as a whole was predominantly Chinese. China currently holds many new patents related to the internal components of these trains, re-designed in China to allow the trains to run at higher speeds than the foreign designs allowed.

However, most of Hexie's (Harmony's) patents are only valid within China, and as such hold no international power. The weakness of intellectual property of Hexie causes obstacles for China to export its high-speed rail related technology, which led to the development of the completely redesigned train brand called Fuxing that is based on local technology.

Development 

Started in 2012, CNR Changchun Railway Vehicles (now CRRC Changchun Railway Vehicles), under the guidance of China Railway Corporation, with a collection of enterprises, universities, and research institutes, carried out the development of a more advanced China Standardized EMU. In December 2013, CRRC Changchun completed developing the general technical conditions for EMUs, and completed the plan design in September 2014. The new EMU was rolled off the production line on 30 June 2015.

According to the arrangement for the China Standardized EMU research and development work, the EMUs will receive  experimental verification and optimization.

The EMU was tested under complicated conditions, including on bridges, in tunnels, and on slopes and turns.

Commercialization 

On 15 August 2016, the China Standardized EMU has started operation on Harbin–Dalian High-Speed Railway. The train was running as Train No. G8041 departed from Dalian North railway station to Shenyang railway station.

From the end of 2016 to the beginning of 2017, several subsidiaries of CRRC gained licences from the National Railway Administration to produce the rolling stocks.

The China Standardized EMU started its experimental long haul service on Beijing–Hong Kong High-Speed Railway on 25 February 2017.

On June 25, 2017, the official public name of the China Standardized EMU was unveiled as "Fuxing", signaling a departure from the "" (Harmony) branding of the previous high speed trains. The next day, a CR400AF departed on its maiden journey from the Beijing South railway station, traveling toward Shanghai, at the same time a CR400BF left Shanghai Hongqiao railway station on its maiden journey bound for Beijing.

After extensive testing since its debut,  operation returned to the Beijing–Shanghai high-speed railway using Fuxing trains on September 21, 2017, once again making the Chinese high speed railway network the fastest in the world.

Specifications and technical features 
The train can carry 556 passengers, with 10 in business class, 28 in first class, and 518 in second class. The train also reduces energy consumption, and adopts a standard parts design. It also has reinforced safety features compared with older EMUs.

It also provides Wi-Fi access.

Variants

All variants of Fuxing train are compatible. The EMU models shares the same standard required by China Railway Corporation, hence the name China Standardized EMU. Fuxing train models can be identified by the designation. The number in the designation represents the speed class in kilometers per hour. The first letter after speed is the manufacturer code, with A being the CRRC Qingdao Sifang and B being the CRRC Changchun Railway Vehicles. The second letter after the speed represents whether the train set is powered by self-propelled multiple units or locomotives. Additional variants can be identified with the letter after the dash: No letter indicates the standard 8 car configuration. A indicates a 16-car configuration; B indicates 17-car configurations; C indicates 8-car multiple units with automatic train operation capability; G indicates 8-car sandstorm and cold climate resistant trainset; and Z indicates 8-car configuration with redesigned interior and exterior. Some variants have two letters indicating combined configuration, such as type GZ being the train set featuring extreme weather resistant capability (type G) and redesigned interior and exterior (type Z). 
It is manufactured by CRRC Qingdao Sifang.
 KCIC400AF/AF-CIT
 Exported derivative of the CR400AF for Jakarta-Bandung high speed line.
CR400AF–A 16-car version manufactured by CRRC Qingdao Sifang. The first CR400AF-A started operation in July 2018 on the Beijing–Shanghai high-speed railway.
CR400AF–B 17-car version manufactured by CRRC Qingdao Sifang. Testing started in 2018 and entered passenger service in 2019 in response to high passenger demand on the Beijing–Shanghai high-speed railway.
CR400AF–C 8-car ATO enabled version with redesigned interior and exterior. It is manufactured by CRRC Qingdao Sifang.
CR400AF–G 8-car sandstorm and cold climate resistant version. It is manufactured by CRRC Qingdao Sifang.
CR400AF–Z 8-car variant with redesigned and upgraded interior and exterior. It is manufactured by CRRC Qingdao Sifang.
CR400AF–BZ 17-car variant with redesigned and upgraded interior and exterior. It is manufactured by CRRC Qingdao Sifang.
CR400AF–GZ 8-car sandstorm/cold resistant with redesigned and upgraded interior and exterior. It is manufactured by CRRC Qingdao Sifang.

It is manufactured by CRRC Changchun Railway Vehicles.
CR400BF–A 16-car version manufactured by CRRC Changchun Railway Vehicles. Testing of this variant started on March 9, 2018. The first CR400BF-A started operation of the Beijing–Shanghai high-speed railway on June 29, 2018.
CR400BF–B 17-car version. It is manufactured by CRRC Changchun Railway Vehicles.
CR400BF–C 8-car ATO enabled version with redesigned interior and exterior used on the Beijing–Zhangjiakou intercity railway in preparation for the 2022 Winter Olympics. It is manufactured by CRRC Changchun Railway Vehicles. The interior design incorporates snow and ice elements with blue ambient light. The train is also equipped with high-definition LED destination displays, wireless charging for business class seats, and smart glass windows. Additional features include snowboard storage and urine sampling areas. The trains are manufactured by CRRC Changchun Railway Vehicles. CR400BF–C started operating on December 30, 2019, with the opening of the Beijing–Zhangjiakou ICR.

CR400BF–G 8-car sandstorm and cold climate resistant version for use in more extreme weather. It is manufactured by CRRC Changchun Railway Vehicles. Shares same exterior style as the CR400BF.
CR400BF–Z 8-car variant with redesigned and upgraded interior and exterior. It is manufactured by CRRC Changchun Railway Vehicles.
CR400BF–BZ 17-car variant with redesigned and upgraded interior and exterior. It is manufactured by CRRC Changchun Railway Vehicles.
CR400BF–GZ 8-car sandstorm/cold resistant version with redesigned interior and exterior. It is manufactured by CRRC Changchun Railway Vehicles.
It is manufactured by CRRC Qingdao Sifang.
It is manufactured by CRRC Changchun Railway Vehicles.

Specification

Incidents and equipment issues 
 On 8 February 2018, a train numbered G89 from Beijing West railway station to Chengdu East railway station, serviced by CR400BF-5033 (with 576 seats), was forced to discontinue its journey at Xi'an North railway station, due to a mechanical malfunction (hot box). No passengers were injured. Passengers were then transferred to a CRH380B trainset with only 556 seats.
 On 27 June 2018, train no. G123 from Beijing South railway station to Shanghai Hongqiao railway station was late by 49 minutes, as it sustained an equipment failure due to an earlier service G239 which is provided by Hexie type CRH380B EMU.
 On 12 August 2018, train no. G40 from Hangzhou East railway station to Beijing South railway station collided with a flying steel plate, which was blown away from a nearby construction site close to Langfang railway station. The flying steel plates not only damaged the train itself, but caused serious traffic disruptions on the Beijing–Shanghai high-speed railway as the overhead catenary also sustained damages. Passengers were transferred to buses, while the damaged train was hauled to Beijing South railway station by a Dongfeng 11 diesel locomotive.
 On 26 September 2018 an inbound CR400BF-A trainset was unable to properly open its doors at Hong Kong West Kowloon railway station, as the platform edge reached beyond the track's structure gauge. The vehicle was redirected to a different platform. No injuries were reported.
 During the one week holiday of the National Day of the People's Republic of China (October 1–7, 2018), various services of Fuxing were forced to stop at intermediate stations along their routes, as they had been immobilized by the crowd of passengers, causing traffic disruptions. Unlike Hexie, Fuxing trains are equipped with devices that are capable of detecting certain levels of overcrowding, preventing them from any further movement to ensure safety until train staff manage to remove the necessary number of passengers.
 On 17 October 2018, China Railway Shanghai Group reported that it has implemented portable air quality measurement devices to monitor the level of hazardous fumes emitted by possibly substandard heat resistant surfaces in the passenger carriages as several complaints have been recorded by passengers and train drivers, stating the smell in the carriages is unbearable. Some passengers also suffered minor respiratory diseases such as coughing and sore throat.

Gallery

See also 
 China Railway High-speed, Chinese high-speed railway service provided by China Railway.
 China Railway, Chinese state-owned corporation that operates all Fuxing trains.
 Hexie (train), a previous generation of EMUs operated by China Railway.

References

 

High-speed trains of China
Electric multiple units of China
Passenger trains running at least at 350 km/h in commercial operations
Passenger trains running at least at 200 km/h in commercial operations
CRRC multiple units
25 kV AC multiple units